The Men's under-23 road race of the 2015 UCI Road World Championships took place in and around in Richmond, Virginia, United States on September 25, 2015.

Kévin Ledanois became the third French rider to win the title, after making a late solo move in the closing kilometers. He held off Italy's Simone Consonni to take the gold medal, while Ledanois' team mate Anthony Turgis completed the podium, two seconds later.

Qualification

Qualification was based on performances on the UCI run tours and the Men Under 23 Nations' Cup during 2015. Results from January to the middle of August counted towards the qualification criteria. In addition to this number, the current continental champions were also able to take part. The outgoing World Champion, Matej Mohorič, did not compete as he was no longer eligible – he moved to the UCI ProTeam  for the 2015 season. If a nation is included in the final classification of the Men Under 23 Nations' Cup, but that nation was not yet qualified, it may register 6 riders, 3 of whom were starters. The first 5 nations of the final classification of the Men Under 23 Nations' Cup were entitled to an extra rider.

In addition to this number the current continental champions were also able to take part.

Course

The under-23 men rode ten laps on the road race circuit. All road races took place on a challenging, technical and inner-city road circuit. The circuit headed west from Downtown Richmond, working its way onto Monument Avenue, a paver-lined, historic boulevard that's been named one of the "10 Great Streets in America". Cyclists took a 180-degree turn at the Jefferson Davis monument and then maneuvered through the Uptown district and Virginia Commonwealth University. Halfway through the circuit, the race headed down into Shockoe Bottom before following the canal and passing Great Shiplock Park, the start of the Virginia Capital Trail. A sharp, off-camber turn at Rocketts Landing brought the riders to the narrow, twisty, cobbled  climb up to Libby Hill Park in the historic Church Hill neighborhood. A quick descent, followed by three hard turns led to a  climb up 23rd Street. Once atop this steep cobbled hill, riders descended into Shockoe Bottom. This led them to the final  climb on Governor Street. At the top, the riders had to take a sharp left turn onto the false-flat finishing straight,  to the finish.

Schedule
All times are in Eastern Daylight Time (UTC-4).

Participating nations
170 cyclists from 52 nations took part in the men's under-23 road race. The number of cyclists per nation is shown in parentheses.

Prize money
The UCI assigned premiums for the top 3 finishers with a total prize money of €8,049.

Final classification

Alistair Donohoe was disqualified: rule 12.1.040.18 holding on to the car.

References

Men's under-23 road race
UCI Road World Championships – Men's under-23 road race
2015 in men's road cycling